Visual Lies is the third album by the American heavy metal band Lizzy Borden and the only one to feature future David Lee Roth and Ozzy Osbourne guitarist Joe Holmes, credited as J. Holmes.

It features their best known song "Me Against the World" for which the band shot a promotional video. The track was also featured in the 1987 heavy-metal horror film, Black Roses. The movie remains a cult-classic among 80's glam metal fans.

Track listing
All songs by Lizzy Borden and Gene Allen, except where noted 
Side one
 "Me Against the World" - 5:03
 "Shock" (Borden, Allen, Joe Holmes) - 4:35
 "Outcast" - 4:21
 "Den of Thieves" (Borden, Allen, Holmes) - 3:48
 "Visual Lies" - 4:05

Side two
 "Eyes of a Stranger" - 4:27
 "Lord of the Flies" - 5:41
 "Voyeur (I'm Watching You)" - 4:32
 "Visions" (Borden, Allen, Holmes, Joey Scott) - 5:24

Remasterd CD edition bonus tracks
"Me Against the World" (Demo) - 4:53
 "Lord of the Flies" (Demo) - 5:13
 "Visual Lies" (Demo) - 4:08
 "Me Against the World" (Bat2TheSkull Remix - Demo) - 2:23

Band members
Lizzy Borden
Lizzy Borden - vocals
Gene Allen - guitars
Joe Holmes - guitars
Mychal Davis - bass
Joey Scott - drums

Production
Max Norman - producer, engineer, mixing
Bob Ludwig - mastering at Masterdisk, New York

Chart

References

1987 albums
Lizzy Borden (band) albums
Albums recorded at Long View Farm
Albums produced by Max Norman
Enigma Records albums
Metal Blade Records albums